The 2017–18 season is Omonia's 64th season in the Cypriot First Division and 69th year in existence as a football club.

The season covers the period from 1 July 2017 to 30 June 2018.

Transfers

Transfers in

Loans in

Transfers out

Loans out

Squad statistics

Statistics accurate as of 13 May 2018.

Clean sheets 
Includes all competitive matches.

Correct as of matches played on 13 May 2018

Preseason

Friendlies

Competitions

Cypriot First Division

Regular season

League table

Results summary

Results by matchday

Matches

Championship Round

Championship Round table

Results summary

Results by matchday

Matches

Cypriot Cup

Second round

References

AC Omonia seasons
Omonia